MacKenzie is the name of noble family of Scottish origin. Descendants of Rear Admiral Thomas MacKenzie (Foma Kalinovich Mekenzi, Фома Калинович Мекензи -Son of Colin), who was in the service of the Russia Navy .

Notable members 

Foma Fomich Mekenzi (1740–1786), was a Scottish-Russian rear admiral who founded the city of Sevastopol in service of the Russian Empire in 1783. Of Scottish Catholic origin of Clan Mackenzie, he was born in the spring of 1740, two years after his parents' marriage. His mother Ann MacKenzie (née Young) was the granddaughter of Admiral Thomas Gordon, Governor of Kronstadt.

Descendants
Thomas MacKenzie had a son born to Maria Wady, whose descendants are living today.

References

Russian noble families
Russian families of Scottish origin